Volodymyr Nykyforov is a Ukrainian biologist, ecologist and biotechnologist, Doctor of Science, Professor. He serves as first vice-rector of Kremenchuk Mykhailo Ostrohradskyi National University.

Patents
 Method for biological wastewater treatment / Declaratory patent UA 63719 A. − Bul. № 1, 2004
 The method of obtaining biogas from blue-green algae / Declaratory patent UA 24106 U. − Bul. № 9, 2007
 Method of methane and fertilizer production / Utility model patent 104743 № u201509476. − Bul. № 3, 2016 
 Electromagnetic compatibility of electromechanical and biological systems / Certificate of registration of copyright for a work № 69235 from 19.12.2016
 A method for producing biogas from blue-green algae / Utility model patent 105896, № u201509295. − Bul. № 7, 2016
 Computer program «Automated thesaurus formation system based on online translation services» / Certificate of registration of copyright for a work № 66298 from 24.06.2016
 Method for extracting lipids from cyanobacterial biomass using a laser / Utility model patent 137244 № u201903571. − Bul. № 19, 2019

References 

Living people
Ukrainian ecologists
1964 births